The India women's national under-18 volleyball team represents India in women's under-18 volleyball events, it is controlled and managed by the Volleyball Federation of India (VFI) that is a member of Asian volleyball body Asian Volleyball Confederation (AVC) and the international volleyball body government the Fédération Internationale de Volleyball (FIVB).

Team

Coaching staff

Competition history

Youth Olympic Games
  2010 – Did not qualify

World Championship
 1989 – Did not qualify
 1991 – Did not qualify
 1993 – Did not qualify
 1995 – Did not qualify
 1997 – Did not enter
 1999 – Did not enter
 2001 – Did not qualify
 2003 – Did not qualify
 2005 – Did not qualify
 2007 – Did not qualify
 2009 – Did not qualify
 2011 – Did not qualify
 2013 – Did not qualify
 2015 – Banned
 2017 – Did not qualify
 2019 – Did not qualify

Asian Championship
 1997 – Did not enter
 1999 – Did not enter
 2001 – 9th
 2003 – 5th
 2005 – 9th 	
 2007 – 6th 
 2008 – 10th	
 2010 – 13th
 2012 – 6th 
 2014 – 11th
 2017 – Banned
 2018 – 8th
 2022 – 10th

References

External links
Official website

volleyball
Women's volleyball in India
National women's under-18 volleyball teams
Volleyball